McIvers is a town in the Canadian province of Newfoundland and Labrador. The town had a population of 575 in the Canada 2021 Census. The town celebrated its Come Home Year in 2017, following a successful Chase the Ace fundraiser the previous year which largely funded the event. The town is located on the north shore of the Bay of Islands, Newfoundland and Labrador.

Demographics 

See also
 List of cities and towns in Newfoundland and Labrador

References 

Towns in Newfoundland and Labrador